Lionel Hiffler (born October 29 1973) is a French paratriathlete. He is champion of France and world champion of paratriathlon PT3 in 2014.

Biography

Prize list 

 2014 ITU World Triathlon Grand Final Edmonton (PT3)     Edmonton, Canada      1st place

 2014 FRA Paratriathlon National Championships (PT3)    La Ferté Bernard, France       1st place

 2014  Magog ITU World Paratriathlon Event (PT3)   Magog, Canada      2nd place

 2014     Iseo - Franciacorta ITU World Paratriathlon Event (PT3)  Iseo - Franciacorta , Italy         2nd place

 2014    Besançon ITU World Paratriathlon Event (PT3)   Besancon, France     2nd place      

 2013     FRA Paratriathlon National Championships (TRI-4)  Besançon, France           3rd place        

 2010      Dextro Energy Triathlon - ITU World Championship Series London (TRI-4)  London, Great Britain    1st place

References

External links

Living people
French male triathletes
1973 births
Paratriathletes of France
20th-century French people
21st-century French people